Tsingoni is a commune in the French overseas department of Mayotte, in the Indian Ocean.

Mosque 
Tsingoni Mosque, originally built in 1538, is the oldest active mosque in France. It is a listed monument since 2015.

See also 
 Southeast Africa

References 

Populated places in Mayotte
Communes of Mayotte